Courts of Maryland include:
;State courts of Maryland
Supreme Court of Maryland
Appellate Court of Maryland
Maryland Circuit Courts (8 judicial circuits)
Maryland District Courts (34 locations in 12 judicial districts)

Federal courts located in Maryland
United States District Court for the District of Maryland

Former federal courts of Maryland
United States District Court for the District of Potomac (1801–1802; also contained the District of Columbia and pieces of Virginia; extinct, reorganized)

References

External links
National Center for State Courts – directory of state court websites.

Courts in the United States